Psilogramma wernerbacki is a moth of the  family Sphingidae. It is known from the Solomon Islands.

References

Psilogramma
Moths described in 2010
Endemic fauna of the Solomon Islands